Antonius Lambertus Maria Hurkmans (born 3 August 1944) is Bishop emeritus of the Roman Catholic Diocese of 's-Hertogenbosch. His motto is: Sancti Spiritus In virtute (The power of the Holy Spirit).

Early years and calling to the priesthood
Antoon Hurkmans was born in Somernen and grew up in a farming family of nine children. He took his vegetable and grocery diploma and had really his own grocery store in Echt, Netherlands. Because he felt called to the priesthood, he sold his shop and then studied at the College for Late Vocations in Warnsveld. In 1966 he went to the Latin School in Gemert and three years later he spent some time in the Grimbergen Abbey, Belgium. In 1972 Hurkmans left the monastery and went to study theology at the Tilburg University, where he received his doctorate in 1978.

Ecclesiastical career
Hurkmans was ordained priest on 22 December 1979 by Bishop Johannes Bluyssen. He then worked in Waalwijk (Saint Anthony Parish), from December 1, 1980, as pastor. Monsignor Johannes Gerardus ter Schure appointed him in August 1987 rector of the new seminary, St. John's Centre. In March 1988 he became vicar general and provost (religion) of the cathedral chapter of the Roman Catholic Diocese of 's-Hertogenbosch. Because of his merits for the seminary Pope John Paul II appointed him on his birthday in 1994 Honorary prelate and Monsignor. The pope appointed him bishop for the Roman Catholic Diocese of 's-Hertogenbosch in June 1998. On August 29, 1998, he was consecrated bishop by Johannes Gerardus ter Schure, Johannes Bluyssen, Martinus Petrus Maria Muskens, Frans Wiertz and Joseph Frans Lescrauwaet.

References

External links
 https://web.archive.org/web/20090307230957/http://www.katholieknederland.nl/rkkerk/kerkprovincie/bisschoppenconferentie/index_hurkmans.html
 http://www.catholic-hierarchy.org/bishop/bhurkmans.html

21st-century Roman Catholic bishops in the Netherlands
1944 births
People from Someren
Living people
Tilburg University alumni
Members of the Order of the Holy Sepulchre
20th-century Roman Catholic bishops in the Netherlands